The Youngtown Edition is a college newspaper published continually by students attending the County College of Morris since the opening of the college in Fall 1968. The newspaper is published biweekly and is distributed across the college campus. The newspaper covers campus issues, profiles students and professors, and world issues that may impact the campus. The Youngtown Edition has won four (4) Gold Crown awards, given out by the Columbia Scholastic Press Association (2004, 2006, 2007, 2009).

The Youngtown Edition has since fallen victim to oppression and intimidation due to their reporting of the actions taken by the college's administration, headed by President Dr. Tony Iacono. Reports have surfaced of Iacono intimidating student journalists, professors, and faculty for reporting the truth or speaking on their discontent with the administration's actions. Since Iacono has taken over at County College of Morris, The Youngtown Edition has not received any awards.

External links 
 Official website, contains issues from Fall 2003 to present.

Y
Student newspapers published in New Jersey